

The Farman HF.10 was a reconnaissance aircraft built in France shortly before the First World War.

Development
The HF.10 was developed in 1911 for the military aircraft competition (Concours Militaire), held in Reims. The HF.10 had a Gnome Rhone engine, but the subsequent HF.10bis had a slightly more powerful Gnome Gamma engine with a power of 70 hp.

Specifications

References

Bibliography

Further reading

 
 

1910s French military reconnaissance aircraft
HF.10
Single-engined pusher aircraft
1910s French military trainer aircraft
Sesquiplanes
Aircraft first flown in 1912
Rotary-engined aircraft